Father Knows Last may refer to:

In television:
"Father Knows Last" (Cheers)
"Father Knows Last" (Moonlighting)

In other uses:
Father Knows Last: High Risk, Guilty Passion, an omnibus written by Jacqueline Baird and Emma Darcy

See also
Father Knows Best (disambiguation)